The Chutzen (or Chutze; 820 m) is a wooded hill of the Swiss Plateau, located halfway between Lake Biel and Bern. It lies south of the village of Frienisberg and belongs to the municipality of Seedorf. On the summit lies a 45-metre-high wooden tower, the Chutzenturm, which opened in June 2010.

See also
 List of most isolated mountains of Switzerland
 List of mountains of Switzerland accessible by public transport

References

External links

 Chutzen on Hikr
 Chutzenturm

Mountains of the canton of Bern
Mountains of Switzerland
Mountains of Switzerland under 1000 metres